Antonius Musa (Greek  ) was a Greek botanist and the Roman Emperor Augustus's physician; Antonius was a freedman who received freeborn status along with other honours. In the year 23 BC, when Augustus was seriously ill, Musa cured the illness with cold compresses and became immediately famous.

Musa, the plant group which includes the banana, the plantain and numerous other species, was apparently named after him.  However, Musa may be a Latinization the Arabic mauz (موز) name for the fruit. Mauz meaning Musa is discussed in the 11th century Arabic encyclopedia The Canon of Medicine, which was translated to Latin in medieval times and well known in Europe.

Musa's brother was Euphorbus, physician to king Juba II of Numidia, after whom the plant Euphorbia, which has given its name to a scientific genus, was originally named.

A short medical treatise called De herba vettonica and speaking of the properties of this herb has been transmitted under his name, but is thought instead to have been written in the 4th  century. It seems to have been a source for the Roman medical writer Theodorus Priscianus.

According to Francis Atterbury, the character Iapis in Virgil's Aeneid represents Musa while Aeneas represents Augustus.

References

Sources
Pliny the Elder, Natural History 19.38, 25.38; online text at the Perseus Project.
Suetonius, The Twelve Caesars Augustus 58, 79; online text at the Perseus Project.
Cassius Dio, Roman History 53.30.3-6; online text in Greek at the Perseus Project.
Virgil, Aeneid XII.391-402; online text at the Perseus Project.

External links

Year of birth missing
Year of death missing
1st-century BC Roman physicians
Imperial Roman slaves and freedmen
Pre-Linnaean botanists
Musa